The Bartered Crown is a 1914 silent drama black and white film written by A.L. Howie and starring Lionel Barrymore and Betty Gray.

Cast
 Lionel Barrymore as The Landlord
 Betty Gray as Mina, the Lacemaker

References

External links
 

American silent short films
American black-and-white films
Silent American drama films
1914 drama films
1914 films
Biograph Company films
General Film Company
1910s American films